Rubus impar is a rare North American species of flowering plants in the rose family. It is native to the central United States, in the states of Missouri, Illinois, and Indiana.

The genetics of Rubus is extremely complex, so that it is difficult to decide on which groups should be recognized as species. There are many rare species with limited ranges such as this. Further study is suggested to clarify the taxonomy.

References

impar
Plants described in 1934
Flora of the United States